Adam M. Casey is a former Division 1 college football player for the University of Missouri, U.S. Marine Infantry Officer, cancer survivor and founder of the non-profit I Do It For Her. He is a TEDx speaker who uses his non-profit to encourage others to take risks to become their best selves. I Do It For Her provides scholarships to at-risk youth in the St. Louis area and wish-granting resources to help people to accomplish their dreams.

References

American philanthropists
Living people
Year of birth missing (living people)